Ronald Lamb (February 3, 1944June 20, 2000) was an American football running back in the American Football League for the Denver Broncos, Cincinnati Bengals and Atlanta Falcons. He played college football at the University of South Carolina.

Early years
Lamb attended McCormick High School where he was a three-sport athlete. He accepted a football scholarship from the University of South Carolina, where he played wingback and halfback. He also received All-Conference honors as a baseball player.

Professional career

Dallas Cowboys
Lamb was selected by the Dallas Cowboys in the 13th round (190th overall) of the 1966 NFL Draft. He was released after being tried at fullback and flanker, before the start of the season.

Montreal Beavers (CFL)
In 1966, he signed with the Montreal Beavers of the Continental Football League, reuniting with his former South Carolina head coach Marvin Bass. He was sold to the Denver Broncos on October 31, 1967.

Denver Broncos
In 1967, he signed with the Denver Broncos but was limited with a knee injury and was placed on the taxi squad. The next year he earned the starting fullback position. On September 19, 1968, after starting three games he was placed on the injury waiver list, with a neck injury.

Cincinnati Bengals
On October 21, 1968, he was claimed off waivers by the Cincinnati Bengals, where he was a reserve player. On August 7, 1972, he was traded to the Miami Dolphins in exchange for fullback Les Shy. He was released before the start of the season.

Atlanta Falcons
On September 5, 1972, he was claimed off waivers by the Atlanta Falcons. He was activated on September 15, after spending the first two games on the taxi squad. He was waived during the offseason.

Washington Redskins
In 1973, he signed with the Washington Redskins and was released on August 6.

Jacksonville Sharks (WFL)
In 1974, he signed with the Jacksonville Sharks of the World Football League. He announced his retirement on July 28, 1975, after receiving an offer to become a full-time assistant coach with the team.

Personal life
After his retirement from football, he suffered from alcohol abuse which damaged his heart and liver. He died on June 20, 2000.

References

External links
 
Coach Bass Feels Ron Lamb Matured

1944 births
2000 deaths
People from Greenwood County, South Carolina
Players of American football from South Carolina
American football running backs
South Carolina Gamecocks football players
Denver Broncos (AFL) players
Cincinnati Bengals players
Atlanta Falcons players
Jacksonville Sharks players
American Football League players